Alnicola is a genus of fungi in the family Hymenogastraceae of the order Agaricales. The genus has a widespread distribution, and contains 60 species that usually form mycorrhizal relationships with species of Alder. The genus name is synonymous with Naucoria, with the correct genus being Alnicola according to the most recent taxonomic treatment.

Species

References

Hymenogastraceae